Bell Block is a building in Ottawa, Ontario, Canada. It is located on 40 Elgin Street between the Central Chambers and Scottish Ontario Chambers. It was built in 1867 to a design by William Hodgson (1827–1904). Designated as a heritage property under Part IV of the Ontario Heritage Act, it was honoured with an "Award of Excellence" from the City of Ottawa.

References

Buildings and structures in Ottawa
Office buildings completed in 1867
1867 establishments in Ontario
Designated heritage properties in Ottawa